The Japanese anime television series Kaiji: Ultimate Survivor is based on the first part, Gambling Apocalypse: Kaiji, of the manga series Kaiji, written and illustrated by Nobuyuki Fukumoto. The series was broadcast on Nippon TV from October 3, 2007, to April 2, 2008.

A second season, titled Kaiji: Against All Rules and based on the second part of the manga, Tobaku Hakairoku Kaiji, was announced by Weekly Young Magazine in 2011. It was broadcast on Nippon TV from April 6 to September 28, 2011.

In the United States, Kaiji: Ultimate Survivor was streamed on the Joost service in December 2008. In July 2013, Crunchyroll announced the streaming rights to both seasons. In November 2020, Sentai Filmworks announced that they have licensed both seasons of the series for streaming on select digital outlets and home video release. Both season were released in Japanese with English subtitles on Blu-ray Disc on April 20, 2021.



Series overview

Episode list

Kaiji: Ultimate Survivor (2007–08)

Kaiji: Against All Rules (2011)

Notes

References

Kaiji
Kaiji (manga)